Periyanayakichatram  is a village in the Srirangam taluk of Tiruchirappalli district in Tamil Nadu, India.

Demographics 

As per the 2001 census, Perungamani had a population of 972 with 481 males and 491 females. The sex ratio was 1021 and the literacy rate, 64.85.

References 

 

Villages in Tiruchirappalli district